Marco Bello (c. 1470 – 1523) was an Italian painter active in the Renaissance period. He was one of the pupils in the studio of Giovanni Bellini.

References

External links
 

1470s births
1523 deaths
15th-century Italian painters
Italian male painters
16th-century Italian painters
Renaissance painters